Terling Windmill is a grade II listed Smock mill at Terling, Essex, England, which has been converted to residential use.

History

Terling Windmill was built here in c.1818. It is said to have been originally built at Cressing c1770, but this has neither been proved nor disproved. Originally it was a bark mill, but was advertised for sale in 1818 as “new built” and “may be converted to corn grinding at an inconsiderable expense” The mill may have been built here by Chappell, a millwright from Witham.

The mill was painted white until 1929 when the smock was tarred. In 1935, the mill was damaged in a gale and lost its fantail. A new pair of sails from Button's Mill, Diss, Norfolk was fitted in the 1930s. They were brought from Diss by rail and then horse and cart. The mill was working by wind until 1949, and afterwards by external power. On 30 August 1950, the miller was trapped in the machinery and killed, despite the best efforts of the fire brigade to rescue him. Thus the working life of the mill ended. The mill was house converted in 1970, with the major machinery being retained, and its external appearance restored.

Description

Terling Windmill is a four-storey smock mill on a single-storey brick base. A stage was not used. The mill had four double Patent sails and the domed cap was winded by a fantail. When the mill was working, it had a tarred smock with a white cap. After conversion, the mill was painted white, with the cap clad in aluminium sheets.

Mill

Terling Windmill has an octagonal single-storey brick base.

The smock shows signs of having been dismantled and transported in sections at some point, with the cant posts being newer than the framing.

Sails and windshaft

Terling Windmill has a cast-iron windshaft and four double Patent sails. The last working pair of sails came from Button's Mill, Diss, Norfolk, having originally been on the post mill at Mount Pleasant, Framlingham, Suffolk.

Machinery

The wooden Brake Wheel is of clasp arm construction,  diameter, with 96 cogs. The two pairs of French Burr stones being driven by Stone Nuts with 26 cogs, whilst the Peak stones were driven by a Stone Nut with 25 cogs.

Fantail

Terling Windmill was winded by an eight-bladed fantail, driving an iron worm on the curb.

Millers

Wood 1818
Frederick Rust 1859
Charles Joseph Doe 1882 – 1902
Martin Bonner 1902 – 1912
Herbert Bonner 1914 – 1950

References for above:-

Culture and media

Terling Windmill featured in the 1937 film Oh, Mr. Porter! starring Will Hay.

External links
Windmill World webpage on Terling windmill

References

Smock mills in England
Grinding mills in the United Kingdom
Commercial buildings completed in 1818
Grade II listed buildings in Essex
Grade II listed windmills
Windmills in Essex
Octagonal buildings in the United Kingdom
Terling